Murray Harrington Dubbin (August 1, 1929 – October 5, 2022) was an American former politician in the state of Florida.

He served in the Florida House of Representatives from 1963 to 1974. Dubbin was a practicing lawyer, having received his law degree at the University of Florida in 1951.

Eulogized in Miami Herald, 8/10/2022 edition, "Obituary: FL State Rep., Miami Beach attorney Murray Dubbin, 93"
https://www.miamiherald.com/news/local/obituaries/article266909221.html

References

Living people
1929 births
Members of the Florida House of Representatives